Anton Perwein (10 November 1911 – 14 December 1981) was an Austrian field handball player who competed in the 1936 Summer Olympics.

He was part of the Austrian field handball team, which won the silver medal. He played three matches including the final.

External links
profile

1911 births
1981 deaths
Austrian male handball players
Olympic handball players of Austria
Field handball players at the 1936 Summer Olympics
Olympic silver medalists for Austria
Olympic medalists in handball
Medalists at the 1936 Summer Olympics